Wetherby Racecourse is a racecourse situated near the market town of Wetherby in West Yorkshire, England, located  from Leeds city centre. For most of its history the course has hosted only National Hunt racing but staged its first Flat racing fixture in April 2015.

Location
The Racecourse is located on the B1224 York Road, directly adjacent to the A1(M). It is situated opposite Wetherby (HM Prison). There are new access roads between North and East Wetherby and the A1(M). The racecourse can also be accessed from Walton Road at the rear of the stands.

History
Horse racing in Wetherby was first took place on Scaur Bank (now officially known as King George V playing fields, although still most commonly referred to as 'Scaur Bank' or 'The Ings'). In 1891 racing moved to a new site situated off York Road. From the 1920s to the 1950s the racecourse was served by Wetherby Racecourse railway station. In the 1930s the first terraces were erected. A new two-tier stand was erected adjacent to this in the 1970s, and then in 1999 the new Millennium Stand was opened, providing the racecourse with executive banqueting and conference facilities. Up until 1963, Racecourse Specials ran to Wetherby railway station from Bradford Interchange on race days. As the station on York Road had closed many years before, for decades the only rail access was via the station on Linton Road at the other end of Wetherby from the racecourse.

Today

Wetherby Racecourse was the last racecourse in Yorkshire that hosted only National Hunt jump meetings, but it now stages Flat racing as well. The course announced early in 2014 that they were investigating staging summer Flat racing and were granted four fixtures when the 2015 list was released in October 2014. The first Flat racing fixture took place on 26 April 2015.

Notable races

Facilities
The Racecourse features the following facilities, areas and amenities:
 The Wetherby Millennium Stand & Premier Enclosure
 The Paddock Stands and Paddock Gallery
 Parade Ring and Winners Enclosure
 The A1 Bar
 Saddling-Up Bar
 Administration Office & Weighing Room Complex
 First Aid Room
 Pre-Parade Ring & Saddling-Up area
 Tote Credit Club
 The Paddock Bar
 Owners & Trainers Bar
 Stables Complex
 Cafe and Bar
 Tote Betting Shop
 Paddock Bookmakers
 Course Bookmakers
 Betting Ring Information
 Course Enclosure Parking
 White Horse Restaurant
 White Horse Mezzanine Bar
 Marston Moor Bar
 Dine and View Restaurant
 Course Bar
 Course Cafe

Enclosures
Premier Enclosure This is housed within the Millennium Stand.  Although there is no dress code, the management advise a smart-casual attire. Spectators in this enclosure have access to the most luxurious bars and restaurants, including the White Horse Restaurant and Mezzanine Bar.

Paddock Enclosure The largest of the three enclosures is the mid spec, Paddock Enclosure. This is set within the two older stands and has access to the A1 Bar as well as most of the book makers including the large Tote betting shop.

It has its own bar, cafe, Tote Betting Shop, Bookmakers stands and 'big screen'; however, it lacks many of the facilities the other enclosures benefit from.

Pricing 
Admittance pricing varies from £2 to £27. This pricing is only general and may vary depending on the race meeting.

Other events 
 The Racecourse is the starting point for the Great Yorkshire Bike Ride, from Wetherby to Filey.
 The market holds a market and carboot sale every Sunday; this is held in the Course Enclosure. Although it is still large, it no longer receives the popularity it had in the 1980s and 1990s.
 Since 2006 the racecourse has been the venue for the Mascot Gold Cup, the world's largest Mascot race which is held over the final furlong on their family day meeting each April.

References

External links

Official website
Course guide on At The Races

 
Horse racing venues in England
Sport in Leeds
Buildings and structures in Leeds
Sports venues in West Yorkshire
Racecourse Wetherby
Sports venues completed in 1891
1891 establishments in England